The Hours and Times is a 1991 drama film written and directed by Christopher Münch. Starring David Angus and Ian Hart, it is a fictionalized account of what might have happened during a real holiday taken by John Lennon and The Beatles' manager Brian Epstein in 1963.

Plot
It is 1963 and John Lennon flies to Barcelona with The Beatles' manager Brian Epstein for a weekend of relaxation for John. On the flight over they meet air hostess Marianne. John flirts with her and gives her their hotel telephone number.

John asks Brian about gay sex and says that he thinks about it sometimes, but is put off by the thought that it would be painful. They play cards and Brian tells John he is surprised that he brought that up, that he feels awkward about it, that the situation between them is hopeless. John tells him that he finds Brian charming but does not want to have sex with him. He is angry at the thought that everyone they know thinks they are having a sexual relationship. He goes to bed and receives a telephone call from his wife, Cynthia. She says that she misses him, and John says that he misses their son, Julian.

John and Brian go to a gay bar and meet a Spanish man named Quinones. John invites him back to the hotel where the three of them have drinks. Quinones is gay but married. After some friendly conversation he leaves early. Brian is angry with John, calling Quinones a fascist, and saying that nothing matters because he cannot have the one thing he wants. He goes to bed and confides in Miguel, the hotel boy. He asks Miguel for oral sex but then says he is only joking. Later he talks to his mother on the telephone.

The pair look around Barcelona and John takes photographs of Brian. They discuss, among other things, John's relationship with Cynthia, which he does not like to talk to Brian about.

John has a bath and plays the harmonica. Brian enters and sits on the bath. John asks him to scrub his back with a flannel, which Brian starts doing. John starts kissing Brian, who quickly undresses and gets into the bath. They kiss a little more, then John abruptly gets out of the bath and leaves the room. Brian finds him smoking in bed. John says he is not angry but can not put into words what he is thinking. The telephone rings, it is Marianne. John tells her to come up. Brian is angry, saying that he is tired of making allowances for people. Marianne arrives and Brian leaves. Marianne asks John why Brian is upset, and they argue. She says that she can see they care about each other but she thinks John torments Brian. She has brought a new Little Richard record, which they dance to.

John asks Brian about his first time in Barcelona. Brian says he was sent there by his mother a couple of years previously following an incident where he had been robbed and blackmailed by a man he met for sex. Following the trial, Brian was forced to see a psychiatrist and his mother sent him to Spain. Two months later he met The Beatles. Brian tries to get John to promise to meet him in Barcelona in ten years, no matter what they are doing. John agrees to at least remember the arrangement.

Later, Brian lies awake in bed with John sleeping next to him. Brian remembers a time when he took John to his “special place”, the roof of his family's shop and told John how special the time they spent together was to him.

Later, Brian and John plan to go to a bull fight, and John hopes he will not be too squeamish for it.

Cast
 David Angus as Brian Epstein
 Ian Hart as John Lennon
 Stephanie Pack as Marianne
 Robin McDonald as Quinones
 Sergio Moreno as Miguel
 Unity Grimwood as Mother

Production
Director Christopher Münch originally saw The Hours and Times as a "DIY exercise", not expecting the film to secure any distribution. He wrote the script over a few weeks in early 1988 and traveled to England to cast it that spring.

The filming took about four days in Barcelona (the hotel scenes been shot at Avenida Palace Hotel) and a couple of days in London. Münch returned to California where he spent the next two years editing it. The movie was released in 1992 in the US (1991 in Canada), after premiering at Toronto, Berlin, Sundance and New Directors.

Oscilloscope Labs re-released a restoration of the film in 2019, which was screened in Sundance that year.

Awards
The Hours and Times won the Special Jury Recognition award at the 1992 Sundance Film Festival. It was also nominated for the Grand Jury Prize at the same festival.

References

External links
 
 
 from Oscilloscope Laboratories restored release
 "What never was has ended" - an essay on the music of The Hours and Times

1991 films
1991 drama films
1991 independent films
1991 LGBT-related films
American black-and-white films
American drama films
American independent films
American LGBT-related films
Films about John Lennon
Films about the Beatles
Films set in Spain
Films set in 1963
Films set in Barcelona
Films shot in Barcelona
Films shot in London
1990s English-language films
1990s American films